Fazıl Say (born 14 January 1970 in Ankara) is a Turkish pianist and composer.

Life and career 

Fazıl Say was born in 1970. His father, Ahmet Say was an author and musicologist. His mother, Gürgün Say was a pharmacist. His grandfather Fazıl Say with whom he shares the same name with was a member of the Spartakusbund. Say was a child prodigy, who was able to do basic arithmetic with 4-digit numbers at the age of two. His father, having found out that he was playing the melody of "Daha Dün Annemizin" (Turkish version of Ah! vous dirai-je, maman) on a makeshift flute with no prior training, enlisted the help of Ali Kemal Kaya, an oboist and family friend. At the age of three, Say started his piano lessons under the tutelage of pianist Mithat Fenmen.

Say wrote his first piece – a piano sonata – in 1984, at the age of fourteen, when he was a student at the Conservatory of his home town Ankara. It was followed, in this early phase of his development, by several chamber works without an opus number, including Schwarze Hymnen for violin and piano and a guitar concerto. He subsequently designated as his opus 1 one of the works that he had played in the concert that won him the Young Concert Artists Auditions in New York: the Four Dances of Nasreddin Hodja (1990). This work already displays in essence the significant features of his personal style: a rhapsodic, fantasia-like basic structure; a variable rhythm, often dance-like, though formed through syncopation; a continuous, vital driving pulse; and a wealth of melodic ideas that may often be traced back to themes from the folk music of Turkey and its neighbours. In these respects, Fazıl Say stands to some extent in the tradition of composers like Béla Bartók, George Enescu, and György Ligeti, who also drew on the rich musical folklore of their countries. He attracted international attention with the piano piece Black Earth, Op. 8 (1997), in which he employs techniques made popular by John Cage's works for prepared piano.

After this, Say increasingly turned to the large orchestral forms. Taking his inspiration from the poetry (and the biographies) of the writers Nâzım Hikmet and Metin Altıok, he composed works for soloists, chorus and orchestra which, especially in the case of the oratorio Nâzim, Op. 9 (2001), clearly take up the tradition of composers such as Carl Orff. In addition to the modern European instrumentarium, Say also makes frequent and deliberate use in these compositions of instruments from his native Turkey, including kudüm and darbuka drums and the ney reed flute. This gives the music a colouring that sets it apart from many comparable creations in this genre. In 2007 he aroused international interest with his Violin Concerto 1001 Nights in the Harem, Op. 25, which is based on the celebrated tales of the same name, but deals specifically with the fate of seven women from a harem. Since its world premiere by Patricia Kopatchinskaja, the piece has already received further performances in many international concert halls.

Fazıl Say scored a further great success with his first symphony, the Istanbul Symphony Op. 28 (2009), premiered in 2010 at the conclusion of his five-year residency at the Konzerthaus Dortmund. Jointly commissioned by the WDR and the Konzerthaus Dortmund in the framework of Ruhr. 2010, the work constitutes a vibrant and poetic tribute to the metropolis on the Bosporus and its millions of inhabitants. The same year saw the composition, among other pieces, of his Divorce String Quartet, Op. 29, (based on atonal principles), and commissioned works like the Piano Concerto Nirvana Burning, Op. 30, for the Salzburg Festival and a Trumpet Concerto for the Mecklenburg-Vorpommern Festival, premiered by Gábor Boldoczki.

For Sabine Meyer Say has also written a Clarinet Concerto, Op. 36 (2011), that refers to the life and work of the Persian poet Omar Khayyam in response to a commission from the 2011 Schleswig-Holstein Musik Festival, and a Sonata for clarinet and piano (op. 42) for the Festival Kissinger Sommer in 2012. Fazıl Say's works are issued worldwide by the renowned music publishers Schott Music of Mainz.
 	
In his works Gezi Park 1,2 and 3 (op. 48, op. 52, op. 54) from 2013/14 he musically processed the suppression of the protests at the Istanbul Gezi Park.

The lyrics for his song Insan Insan were taken from a centuries-old poem written by Alevi poet Muhyiddin Abdal. The track was orchestrated by Say with vocals from Selva Erdener (soprano), Burcu Uyar (coloratura soprano), Güvenç Dağüstün (baritone) and Cem Adrian ("ethnic vocals").

Fazıl Say is also known for being a passionate supporter of Fenerbahçe Spor Kulübü.

Blasphemy charge 
In April 2012, Say came under investigation by the Istanbul Prosecutor's Office over statements made on Twitter, after declaring himself an atheist and retweeting a message poking fun at the Islamic conception of paradise. Say then announced that he was considering leaving Turkey to live in Japan because of the rise of conservative Islam and growing intolerance in his home country.

On 1 June 2012, an Istanbul court indicted Say with the crime of "publicly insulting religious values that are adopted by a part of the nation", a crime that carries a penalty of up to 18 months in prison. According to Anatolia news agency, Say told the Istanbul court he did not seek to insult anybody, but was merely expressing his uneasiness. The court adjourned the case to 18 February after rejecting his lawyers’ request for an immediate acquittal. “When I read them (Say’s tweets), I was heart-broken, I felt disgraced,” Turan Gümüş, one of the three plaintiffs, told the court.  On 15 April 2013, Say was sentenced to 10 months in jail, reduced from 12 months for good behavior in court.  The sentence was suspended, meaning he was allowed to move freely provided he did not repeat the offense in the next five years.

On appeal, Turkey's Supreme Court of Appeals reversed the conviction on 26 October 2015, ruling that Say's Twitter posts fell within the bounds of freedom of thought and freedom of expression.

Honors and awards 
 Winner of the Young Concert Artists International Auditions (1994)
 Paul A. Fish Foundation Awards (1995)
 Le Monde Awards (2000)
 Echo Klassik (2001)
 German Music Critics’ Best Recording of the Year Award (2001)
 Ambassador of Intercultural Dialogue (2008)
 "Echo" German Record Award (2009)
 "ECHO Klassik 2013 Special Jury Award with Istanbul Symphony Album
 Prix International de la Laïcité 2015 (Comité Laïcité République, France)
 Beethoven Prize 2016 (Beethoven Academy)
 Duisburger Musikpreis (2017)

Artist / Composer in residence 
Staatskapelle Weimar, 2022/23
Alte Oper Frankfurt, 2015/2016
Laeiszhalle Hamburg, 2014/2015
Bodenseefestival, 2014
Wiener Konzerthaus, 2013/2014
Hessischer Rundfunk Frankfurt, 2012/2013
Konzerthaus Berlin, 2010/2011
Schleswig-Holstein Musik Festival 2011
Merano Festival, 2010
Elbphilharmonie Hamburg, 2010
Théâtre des Champs-Élysées, Paris 2010
Festspiele Mecklenburg-Vorpommern 2010
Sumida Triphony Hall, Tokyo 2008
Konzerthaus Dortmund,  2005–2010
Musikfest Bremen 2005
Radio France 2003 & 2005

Recordings 
1993 CD / (SFB) (Scarlatti–Berg–Say)
1996 CD / Troppenote Records (Say)
1998 CD / Warner Music (Mozart Sonatas)
1999 CD / Teldec (Bach)
2000 CD / Teldec (Gershwin)
2000 CD / Teldec (Stravinski–Le sacre)
2001 CD / Teldec (Liszt–Tchaikovski)
2002 CD / İmaj (Nazım)
2003 CD / Naive (Say/Black Earth)
2003 CD / İmaj (Metin Altıok ağıtı)
2003 CD / Bilkent (Nazım)
2004 CD / Naive (Mozart Concertos)
2005 CD / Naive (Beethoven Sonatas for Piano)
2006 CD / Naive (Haydn Sonatas)
2006 CD / Avex (Live in Tokyo)
2007 CD / Naive (Kopatchinskaja–Say / Beethoven / Bartok / Ravel)
2008 CD / Naive (Kopatchinskaja–Say 1001 Nights in the Harem)
2011 Fazil Say: Pictures (CD / DVD)
2012 Istanbul Symphony & Hezarfen Ney Concerto (CD / DVD)
2019 CD / Warner Bros. (Fazil Say plays Say: Troy Sonata, Yürüyen Köşk, two pieces from Art of Piano)
2019 CD / Winter & Winter (Ferhan & Ferzan Önder play Fazil Say: Winter Morning in Istanbul, Gezi Park – Concerto for two pianos & orchestra, Sonata for two pianos)
2019 CD / Sony (1001 Nights in the Harem: Violin Concerto, Grand Bazaar, China Rhapsody)

Chronological list of compositions

Other works

Books 
 Uçak Notları (Airplane Notes) Ankara (1999)
 Metin Altıok Ağıtı (Requiem for Metin Altıok) (2003)
 Yalnızlık Kederi (Sorrow of Solitude) (2009)
 "Fazıl Say: Pianist – Komponist – Weltbürger" by Jürgen Otten (2011)

Videography 
 Fazıl Say – Alla Turca (DVD, 2008)
 Fazıl Say – Live in Japan (DVD)
 Fazıl Say – Nazım (DVD, 2001)
 Fazıl Say – Fenerbahçe Senfonisi (DVD)
 Fazıl Say – Istanbul Symphony Concert (DVD, 2012)
 Fazıl Say – Istanbul Symphony Short Documentary (DVD, 2012)

See also 
 Bilkent University
 Bilkent Symphony Orchestra
 Borusan Istanbul Philharmonic Orchestra
 Konzerthaus Dortmund

References

Other sources
 Fazıl Say Biography 
 Fazıl Say biography, Istanbul University

External links

Charges against Turkish Star Pianist Fazil Say: Facing Trial for Joking on Twitter
Schott-Music Profile
echoklassik.de 

1970 births
Turkish atheism activists
Living people
Musicians from Ankara
Turkish secularists
Turkish classical pianists
Turkish classical composers
21st-century classical composers
Hacettepe University Ankara State Conservatory alumni
20th-century classical composers
Robert Schumann Hochschule alumni
Male classical composers
20th-century atheists
21st-century atheists
Male classical pianists
21st-century classical pianists
20th-century male musicians
21st-century male musicians
Naïve Records artists
Turkish composers